Hularu is a village on the west coast of Guadalcanal, Solomon Islands. It is an isolated village, located beyond the extent of the Kukum Highway.

References

Populated places in Guadalcanal Province